Punjab Remote Sensing Centre (PRSC) is an autonomous organization under the Department of Agriculture, Government of Punjab state in India. PRSC has MoUs with Panjab University, Chandigarh, Guru Nanak Dev Engineering College, Ludhiana and Lovely Professional University.

Projects
e-Pehal, an android Mobile app for monitoring tree plantation.
i-Khet Machine, e-PeHaL and e-Prevent apps for informers to make the government aware regarding stubble burning incidents around them.
Online property information by geospatial technology in revenue and property mapping.

See also
E-governance in Punjab

References 

Companies based in Punjab, India
State agencies of Punjab, India
1987 establishments in Punjab, India
Government agencies established in 1987